Florian Bieber (born 4 October 1973) is a Luxembourgian political scientist, historian and professor working on inter-ethnic relations, ethnic conflict and nationalism, focusing primarily on Balkans.

Education 
In 1991–1992, he studied History, Political Science, Economics and Languages at Trinity College. He received a magister degree in History and Political Science with honors on the topic "Bosnia-Herzegovina and Lebanon: A comparative Study“ in 1997.

In 1998, he received M.A.in Southeastern Studies at Central European University in Budapest and the topic was: „The Rise of Serbian Nationalism in the 1980s“, and in 2001, he earned PH.D. title with honours on the topic: “Serbian Nationalism from the Death of Tito to the Fall of Milošević.”

Career  
His academic career began in Central European University, where he was Assistant and Instructor from 1998 until 2000. From 2001 until 2002 he was Regional Representative in European Center for Minority Issues in Belgrade and Sarajevo and at the same centre he became Project Advisor in 2002.

He was Collaborating Researcher at United Nations Research Institute For Social Development on the project "Ethnic Structure, Inequality and Governance of the Public Sector 2002–2005" and published a book in 2006 "Post-War Bosnia: Ethnicity, Inequality and Public Sector Governance".

He became lecturer in East European Politics at University of Kent's Department of Politics and International Relations in 2006 until 2010. He became professor for Southeast European History and Politics at University of Graz in 2010 and in 2011 he also became Director of Center for Southeast European Studies.  Currently he is Vice President of Association for the Study of Nationalities and coordinates the work of the Balkans in Europe Policy Advisory Group.

Furthermore, he has taught at Cornell University and the University of Bologna and Sarajevo and has been a visiting fellow at the London School of Economics.

In an article published on Balkan Insight, Bieber wrote about the criticism and the labels he has faced by the ruling party of Serbia. He has been labeled, among other things, "on-duty Serb-hater", "propagandist", and "professor of hatred and propaganda" in the Serbian media, following his criticism of the Serbian government for its handling of the COVID-19 pandemic in Serbia and other issues. Marko Đurić, senior member of the ruling party, has called for Bieber to be declared persona non grata. According to Bieber, such names say more about the politics of the Serbian Progressive Party than about him.

Editorial work 
He is also Editor-in-Chief of the open access journal Contemporary Southeastern Europe. He is in editorial board of Global Security, Ethnopolitics, Südosteuropa, Političke perspective (Serbo-Croatian for Political Perspectives), Migracijske i etničke teme (Croatian for Migration and ethical themes), European Autonomy and Diversity Papers.

Publications 
He has authored and co-authored dozens of books, journal articles and news columns. His works include minorities and minority rights issues as well as multi-ethnic states, nationalism and ethnic conflict in the Southeastern Europe (especially Western Balkans) In 2017, he has signed the Declaration on the Common Language of the Croats, Serbs, Bosniaks and Montenegrins.

Books 
Bieber, F. (2020). Debating Nationalism. The Global Spread of Nations. Bloomsbury.
Bieber, F. (2020). The Rise of Authoritarianism in the Western Balkans. Palgrave.
Bieber, F., & Galijaš, A. (2016). Debating the end of Yugoslavia. Routledge.
Bieber, F. (2005). Post-war Bosnia: Ethnicity, inequality and public sector governance. Springer.
Bieber, F. (2005). Nationalismus in Serbien vom Tode Titos bis zum Ende der Ära Milošević  [Serbian Nationalism from the Death of Tito to the Fall of the Milošević] (Vol. 18). LIT Verlag Münster. (In German)
Bieber, F. D., Bieber, F., & Daskalovski, Ž. (Eds.). (2003). Understanding the war in Kosovo. Psychology Press. 
Bieber, F. (1999). Bosnien-Herzegowina und der Libanon im Vergleich. Historische Entwicklung und Politisches System vor dem Bürgerkrieg, Sinzheim.

References

External links 
Official website
Google Scholar profile

University of Graz
Luxembourgian political scientists
1974 births
Living people
Signatories of the Declaration on the Common Language